Ansó Aragonese is a variety of Western Aragonese spoken in Ansó Valley, included Ansó, Biniés and Fago.

Phonetics 
Final -r is not pronounced in Ansó but it's still pronounced in Fago.

Morphology 
The most documented article system in Ansó Aragonese is o, a, os, as but it is also used the old system lo, la, los, las in certain contexts:

fendo lo fatuo
le'n diremos a la ermana

The verb haver (to have) as impersonal in general Aragonese (b)i ha, (b)i heva is replaced by the verb estar (to be):

 bi'stá augua.
 bi'stava augua.

There is a first-person personal ending-i in some tenses:
 yo fevai.
 yo tenevai.

It is one of the few Aragonese varieties that still have this characteristic (it is believed that feve, teneve in Gistaín Aragonese is an evolution of this AI > e) that may also be found in the Spanish spoken in Embún, Salvatierra de Esca and Uncastillo and in the Aragonese language spoken in some villages in the North of the Cinco Villas such as Longás and Fuencalderas.

See also 
Aragonese dialects

References 
 Article in Gran Enciclopedia Aragonesa

External links 
 A video in Ansó Aragonese
 L'ansotano, estudio del habla del Valle de Ansó
 Presentation of the book El aragonés ansotano: estudio lingüístico de Anso y Fago

Aragonese dialects
Province of Huesca